Laura Pigossi Herrmann de Andrade (born 2 August 1994) is a Brazilian professional tennis player. She won a bronze medal at the 2020 Tokyo Olympics, playing alongside Luisa Stefani.  

Pigossi has won seven singles titles and 41 doubles titles on the ITF Circuit. On 29 August 2022, she reached her best singles ranking of world No. 100, following her first WTA Tour final in the 2022 Copa Colsanitas. On 3 February 2020, she peaked at No. 125 in the WTA doubles rankings.

Playing for Brazil Fed Cup team since 2013, Pigossi has a win-loss record of 8–6 in Fed Cup competition as of December 2022.

Career

2020–2021: Olympics debut and historic bronze medal
Pigossi is an Olympic bronze medallist from the 2020 Tokyo Olympics in the doubles event. She partnered with Luisa Stefani to defeat Veronika Kudermetova and defending gold medallist Elena Vesnina to win the bronze medal. Pigossi and Stefani became the first Brazilians to obtain an Olympic medal in tennis in history, surpassing Fernando Meligeni's campaign that took 4th place in 1996. The medal was one of the most unexpected: the Brazilians got an Olympic spot at the last minute, confirmed one week before the Games opened, with Stefani ranked No. 23 in the doubles ranking and Pigossi only at No. 190. Although the Brazilian pair had lost in the only game they played together before, during the campaign, they managed to save eight match points. In addition to the four in the bronze-medal match, they saved another four in the match against Czech duo Karolína Plíšková/Markéta Vondroušová in the round of 16.

2022: Grand Slam & top 100 & WTA 1000 debut
In 2022, she played her first qualifying at a Grand Slam at the Australian Open. After some decent campaigns on the ITF Circuit, Pigossi had her first WTA Tour-level wins at Copa Colsanitas in Bogotá, Colombia, coming from the qualifyings and reaching the finals. The campaign in Bogotá included wins against Dayana Yastremska in the quarterfinals and top seed Camila Osorio in the semifinals before losing the final to Tatjana Maria. Consequently, Pigossi reached a new career-high (No. 126) in the singles rankings on 11 April 2022. In May, she reached two second rounds at WTA 125-level in Saint-Malo and Karlsruhe. At the French Open, Pigossi made the qualifying draw as the 16th seed.

In June, she made her Grand Slam debut at Wimbledon.

At the Guadalajara Open, she made her main-draw debut as a lucky loser at the WTA 1000-level.

2023: Australian Open debut
She made her debut at the Australian Open as a lucky loser.

Performance timelines
Only main-draw results in WTA Tour, Grand Slam tournaments, Fed Cup/Billie Jean King Cup, and Olympic Games are included in win–loss records.

Singles
Current after the 2023 Australian Open.

Olympics medal matches

Doubles: 1 (bronze medal)

WTA career finals

Singles: 1 (runner-up)

ITF Circuit finals

Singles: 18 (7 titles, 11 runner–ups)

Doubles: 65 (41 titles, 24 runner–ups)

Fed Cup/Billie Jean King Cup participation

Singles (3–2)

Doubles (4–3)

Notes

References

External links

 
 
 

1994 births
Living people
Tennis players from São Paulo
Brazilian female tennis players
South American Games bronze medalists for Brazil
South American Games medalists in tennis
Competitors at the 2014 South American Games
Competitors at the 2010 South American Games
Olympic tennis players of Brazil
Tennis players at the 2020 Summer Olympics
Medalists at the 2020 Summer Olympics
Olympic medalists in tennis
Olympic bronze medalists for Brazil
21st-century Brazilian women
20th-century Brazilian women